Konrad Freiherr von Wangenheim (20 August 1909 in Hanover – 28 January 1953) was a German army Cavalry officer, a horse rider who competed at the 1936 Summer Olympics in Berlin, securing a gold medal for the German equestrian team whilst suffering from a broken collarbone.

Biography
In 1936 he and his horse Kurfürst won the gold medal as part of the German eventing team in the team eventing competition after finishing 24th in the individual eventing competition.

Wangenheim became a Captain (Rittmeister) with Cavalry Regiment No. 8 (Reiter-Regiment 8, later renamed Kavallerie-Regiment 8) garrisoned at Breig in Silesia. In July 1944, while serving as a German Army officer on the Eastern Front during the Second World War, he was captured by the Red Army. After being held as a prisoner of war for several years, while awaiting repatriation to Germany from the Soviet Union, in 1953 he was found hanged in Stalingrad, Russia. He may have committed suicide.

He was the father of the professional fashion photographer Chris von Wangenheim.

References
 
DatabaseOlympics.com profile
Wallechinsky, David and Jaime Loucky (2008). "Equestrian: Three-Day Event, Team". In The Complete Book of the Olympics - 2008 Edition. London: Aurum Press, Limited. pp. 567–8.

1909 births
1953 deaths
German event riders
Olympic equestrians of Germany
German male equestrians
Equestrians at the 1936 Summer Olympics
Olympic gold medalists for Germany
German prisoners of war in World War II held by the Soviet Union
German people who died in Soviet detention
Suicides by hanging in Russia
Barons of Germany
Olympic medalists in equestrian
Medalists at the 1936 Summer Olympics
Sportspeople from Hanover
German Army officers of World War II